Cusi Cusi is a village located in the Santa Catalina and Rinconada Department of Jujuy Province, Argentina.

References 

Populated places in Jujuy Province